Karol Zalewski (born 7 August 1993) is a Polish athlete who specialises in the sprinting events. He reached the semifinals of the 2013 World Championships in the 200 metres. He is also the 2013 European U23 champion over that distance.

Career
The Polish quartet of Karol Zalewski, Rafał Omelko, Łukasz Krawczuk, Jakub Krzewina broke the world indoor record in the men's  with a stunning finish to the final track event of the 2018 World Indoor Championships in Birmingham. Krzewina overtook the leaders from the beginning - Americans on the last straight and achieved the greatest success in their career.

Competition record

1Did not start in the semifinals

Personal bests
Outdoor
100 metres – 10.25 (+0.9 m/s, Bydgoszcz 2013)
200 metres – 20.26 (-0.3 m/s, Sopot 2016)
400 metres – 45.11 (Berlin 2018)
Indoor
60 metres – 6.75 (Spała 2016)
200 metres – 20.64 (Toruń 2018)
400 metres – 46.20 (Toruń 2018)

References

1993 births
Living people
Polish male sprinters
People from Kętrzyn County
World Athletics Championships athletes for Poland
Athletes (track and field) at the 2016 Summer Olympics
Athletes (track and field) at the 2020 Summer Olympics
Olympic athletes of Poland
World Athletics Indoor Championships winners
Polish Athletics Championships winners
Olympic gold medalists for Poland
Medalists at the 2020 Summer Olympics
Olympic gold medalists in athletics (track and field)
20th-century Polish people
21st-century Polish people